A Fine, Windy Day is a 1980 South Korean film written and directed by Lee Jang-ho.

Plot
The lives of three young working-class male friends are followed in the film. Chun-shik works at a barbershop where he is in love with Miss Yu, a co-worker. Gil-nam, a hotel worker, is in love with Jin-ok, who works at a hair salon. Duk-bae, the most innocent of the trio, works at a Chinese restaurant and is torn between his affections for a factory-worker and Myung-hi, a wealthy girl. Together over drinks, the three young men talk over their lives and their aimless thoughts about the future. At the end of the film they are separated when Chun-shik is arrested for assault, and Gil-nam leaves to begin his military service.

Cast
 Lee Yeong-ho... Chun-shik (barbershop worker)
 Ahn Sung-ki... Duk-bae (Chinese restaurant worker)
 Kim Seong-chan... Gil-nam (hotel worker)
 Im Ye-jin... Choon-soon (Chun-shik's younger sister)
 Kim Bo-yeon... Miss Yu (barbershop worker)
 Yu Ji-in...
 Choi Bool-am... Kim He-jang
 Kim Hee-ra... Female Chinese restaurant worker
 Park Won-sook... Female Chinese restaurant owner
 Kim In-moon... Man at the outdoor food stand
 Kim Young-ae... Woman at the outdoor food stand

Awards
Grand Bell Awards (1980)
 Best Director: Lee Jang-ho
 Best New Actor: Ahn Sung-ki
 Best Screen Adaptation

Baeksang Arts Awards (1981)
 Grand Award: Lee Jang-ho
 Best Production: Lee Woo-suk
 Best Performance by a New Actor: Kim Seong-chan

Notes

Bibliography
 
 
 

1980 films
1980s Korean-language films
South Korean drama films
Films directed by Lee Jang-ho
Grand Prize Paeksang Arts Award (Film) winners